Cosimo Nannini (born 4 January 1999) is an Italian professional footballer who plays as a defender for  club Arzignano.

Club career
Born in Bagno a Ripoli, Nannini was formed in the Fiorentina and Prato youth systems. He made his debut in 2017–18 Serie D for Sangiovannese, and later signed for Bari. Nannini was loaned to Lecco for the 2020–21 season.

On 11 August 2021, he signed a two-year contract with Lucchese.

On 29 August 2022, Nannini moved to Arzignano.

References

External links 
 
 
 

1999 births
Living people
Sportspeople from the Metropolitan City of Florence
Italian footballers
Association football defenders
Serie C players
Serie D players
ACF Fiorentina players
A.C. Prato players
A.S.D. Sangiovannese 1927 players
S.S.C. Bari players
Piacenza Calcio 1919 players
Calcio Lecco 1912 players
S.S.D. Lucchese 1905 players
F.C. Arzignano Valchiampo players
People from Bagno a Ripoli
Footballers from Tuscany